Kristopher Kolumbus Jr. is a 1939 Warner Bros. Looney Tunes animated cartoon directed by Bob Clampett. The short was released on May 13, 1939, and stars Porky Pig in the role of Christopher Columbus.

Plot

Since this cartoon is set in 1492, Porky Pig is the star of the short as Kristopher Kolumbus Jr. himself with a song at the title card. The short begins with the 1492 text zooming and forming smoke with the announcer saying that the astronomers thought "the world was flat as a pancake" with a sign on top, located not too far from Saturn. Porky Pig (as Christopher Columbus) proposes to Queen Isabella of Spain to travel the world and prove that it is not flat. When the queen doubts whether the world is round, Porky gives the queen a demonstration by holding on to a baseball. Porky then starts to do a trick with his arm and aims it to the right. He winds up 4 times until he immediately throws the baseball into the horizon as Porky looks at the right, then waits for it to return from the other side, so he turns to the left. The ball continued its journey until he catches it in his hand. It turns out that it has stamps covered over, which proves it has been through parts of the United States (like Ohio, Los Angeles, and New York) and China. The Queen is convinced and gives Porky enough money to make his voyage.

Porky addresses his crew that they are going to travel the Atlantic Ocean, but they are seemingly scared with their legs moving from left-to-right. When Porky asks them: "Why fellas, you ain't scared to go, are you? What are you men or mice?", they then looked in different directions until they shrink smaller and smaller, as they transform into mice, giving the answer in a chipmunk voice that they are mice, and run off down the ship (with another one sliding down). Porky then however was shown holding the flag rope with appeals a pair of underpants. Then it shows a view of a banner reading "Bon Voyage Kris" with the audience in the background. Many signs appear as Porky speeds with his boat with many signs, such as Highway 441 and a no parking after 5 miles sign. The boat then acts like a car, turning left. Meanwhile, at nighttime, Porky now decides to make the voyage on his own, navigating with the help of arrows pointing to America in the sky, with one being when he looks through the telescope (which is the next scene) showing in his telescope an arrow pointing left to America with stars. He stutters about messing up his history. The scene then shifts to the next day and the next night in a flash. The announcer then says "Hey! that is only 39"! The scene then shifts back from day to night, and fixed it. Porky then looks at a map, with the announcer telling about sea serpents. Porky said there is no such things as sea serpents. Porky then turns to the right, with the serpent looking at Porky, smiling. He then finds the serpent in a friendly manner until he notice that it is a serpent. So he runs in fear, up to the highest pole of the ship. Then the serpent shows off his muscles in front of the camera, until an even bigger serpent jumps out of nowhere with Porky's boat on his head, telling the other serpent "oh, yeah?!" (The same quote "oh, yeah?!" was later used in a couple more shorts), the other serpent then looks from the bottom to his head of the bigger serpent, staring for a moment, and forcing the other serpent to run in fear. They all run off, and Porky's boat was then fallen back to sea. After an encounter with some sea serpents, Porky continues to look at his telescope. After the telescope acts a bit funny, he finally discovers America with grass acting like the sea. A parody version of a Statue of Liberty was shown after Porky jumps all excited. A sign was then shown to the left, saying "Attention paleface! Try our Dandruff Cure, one scalp treatment lasts a lifetime. From the Tom E. Hawke Method". After a moment of staring, a steamboat was then shown with a sign reading "Excursion to see the white men, 30 degrees", where the camera greets the Native Americans. After a moment of showing the Native Americans, the chief later came surfboarding on a wooding plank. He turns in many curves and finally reaching in Porky's ship. Porky with the greedy chief who is angry, then cheerfully starts to introduce to the greedy chief. The chief later gives Porky the signal until he crazily gets close to his face with a quote which is later used in Fresh Fish in November: "How do you do?" Porky however then appears in a car during a parade with a view of the city covered with graffiti (the same gag however was also used on MGM 6 years earlier from at the end of Willie Whopper's first short from July/August 1933 "The Air Race"). Shortly afterwards, Porky then raveled back with him to Spain, where a same clip before Porky's destination from the beginning then plays afterwards, showing a view of the banner with the sound of the audience. Porky then starts to show the queen the Native Americans they brought with after Porky's visit. Shortly afterwards, they perform a jitterbug dance with all of the Native Americans and Porky dancing in front of the queen who is still sitting on her throne. At one point afterwards, her Majesty orders the dance to stop for a total of 18 seconds, only for her to join in. Once the queen said go, the queen was joined in the dance. At that note, the cartoon irises out as the cartoon ends.

Notes

The joke where Porky proves the world is round by throwing a baseball into the horizon, then waiting for it to return from the other side and show to the queen that it has stamps covered over it to show it has been through parts of the United States and China was later re-used in another Warner Brothers cartoon, namely Bob McKimson's Hare We Go (1951), which stars Bugs Bunny meeting Columbus.

When the Indian chief greets Porky he says "How DO you do?", which is a reference to the catchphrase of radio comedian Bert Gordon's comedy character "The Mad Russian". This joke was often made in a lot of Looney Tunes cartoons.

The scene where the Indians dance has re-used animation from an earlier Clampett cartoon, Sweet Sioux.

References

External links
 

Looney Tunes shorts
Warner Bros. Cartoons animated short films
Porky Pig films
1939 animated films
1939 films
American black-and-white films
Films directed by Bob Clampett
Age of Discovery films
Films set in Spain
Films about Native Americans
Films set in pre-Columbian America
Cultural depictions of Christopher Columbus
Cultural depictions of Isabella I of Castile
Fiction set in 1492
Films scored by Carl Stalling
1930s English-language films
1930s American films